Hurricane Marilyn  was the most powerful hurricane to strike the Virgin Islands since Hurricane Hugo of 1989, and the third such tropical cyclone in roughly a two-week time span to strike or impact the Leeward Islands, the others being Hurricane Iris and the much more powerful and destructive Hurricane Luis. The thirteenth named storm, seventh hurricane and third major hurricane of the extremely active 1995 Atlantic hurricane season, Marilyn formed on September 12 as a tropical depression from a tropical wave that moved off the coast of Africa on September 7. After formation, the storm quickly became a tropical storm, and steadily intensified into a hurricane by the time it struck the Lesser Antilles on September 14 at Category 1 strength. Entering the northeastern Caribbean Sea, rapid intensification ensued and it peaked on September 16 north of Puerto Rico as a Category 3 hurricane shortly after it had impacted the U.S. Virgin Islands. A Hurricane Hunter reconnaissance flight reported hail, which is unusual for tropical cyclones. After heading north past Bermuda, Marilyn weakened and became extratropical on September 22. The remnant circulation wandered the Atlantic Ocean from September 23 – October 1, just south of Nova Scotia.

Marilyn is responsible for a total of thirteen deaths, most due to drowning on boats or offshore.
Eleven thousand people were left homeless on the island of St. Thomas, and estimated damages were set at $2 billion (1995 USD) in the USVI. The same area would be struck by Hurricane Bertha the next year, while still repairing from Hurricanes Luis and Marilyn, then successively hit by Hortense, Erika, Georges, Jose, Lenny and Debby.

Meteorological history

Marilyn's origins were from a tropical wave that formed off the African coast on September 7. Large, low-level winds were included in the wave's circulation, but little convection existed. The system continued west for a few days at about  next to an anticyclonic aloft. On September 12, satellite pictures viewed the disorganized wave and declared it Tropical Depression Fifteen, after convection had increased. Tropical Depression Fifteen strengthened rapidly, becoming Tropical Storm Marilyn six hours later. One day after being named, Marilyn was upgraded to hurricane status, while turning on a more northwesterly track.

For the next few days, Marilyn's track took it towards the west-northwest and to the northwest, due to a weakness in the subtropical ridge. Marilyn passed over Dominica, and just Îles des Saintes and southwest of Guadeloupe on September 14, bringing heavy rains and strong winds with it. The eyewall, east-southeast of the center of Marilyn, passed over Saint Thomas later that day. After passing over Puerto Rico, Marilyn entered back into the Atlantic Ocean on September 16.

A low had formed near Marilyn, which may have enhanced outflow from the system. Reconnaissance data found a concentric pair of eyewall wind maxima. The central pressure also rose up 20 mbars in only 10 hours. This rapid weakening was caused by westerly shear and dry air entrained in the system, a decaying eyewall, and especially cool waters upwelled from the previous powerful storm, Hurricane Luis. As Marilyn encountered more westerly shear, it weakened to below hurricane status and made its extratropical transition on September 20, centered in the northeastern Atlantic. The remnant circulation continued to erratically move through the central Atlantic Ocean for another 10 days before being absorbed by a frontal low on September 30.

A Hurricane Hunter reconnaissance flight reported hail, which is unusual for tropical cyclones.

Preparations

Seventeen watches and/or warnings were issued in association with Marilyn. The first two were a tropical storm watch and a tropical storm warning issued on Barbados, St. Vincent, Grenadines, St. Lucia and Grenada on September 12 at 2200 UTC. Five hours later, a tropical storm watch was issued for Trinidad and Tobago. A tropical storm warning was issued for St. Lucia, St. Vincent, Grenadines, Grenada and Tobago at 900 UTC September 13. At 2100 UTC, a Hurricane Warning was issued for Barbados, St. Vincent, Grenadines, St. Lucia and a hurricane watch for Dominica. A hurricane watch as released for Martinique on September 14. The 2100 UTC September 13 was extended for the Grenadines through St. Martin, except Guadeloupe, St. Barthelemy and French portion of St. Martin. At 1500 UTC, Puerto Rico was put under a Hurricane Watch. At 1700 UTC, Guadeloupe, St. Barthelemy, and French portion of St. Martin were put under a hurricane watch. Four hours later, Puerto Rico, U.S. and British Virgin Islands, and Guadeloupe were put under a hurricane warning.

Throughout the night, several watches and warnings were discontinued. At 1500 UTC September 15, Dominican Republic from Cabrera to Cabo Engano were put under a hurricane watch as Marilyn approached. During the night of September 16, all currently active watches and warnings were discontinued. At around the same time, a new Hurricane watch was released for Turks and Caicos and Mayaguana, Acklins, and the Crooked Islands of the southeastern Bahamas. This warning was discontinued within 48 hours. At 1500 UTC September 18, Bermuda came under a Tropical Storm Watch, which was upgraded to a warning in six hours. The warning was discontinued on September 19.

The 250,000 residents of Barbados spent the night of September 13 in shelters.

Impact

Marilyn caused about $2.3 billion and 13 deaths throughout the United States Virgin Islands and Puerto Rico. The exact figure for damages in the U.S. Virgin Islands and Puerto Rico is not available, although the American Insurance Services Group set the combined damage at $875 million. Aside from high winds and seas, one possible explanation for the storm's heavy damage may have been complacency on the part of local island populations. Marilyn followed on the heels of Luis, a more powerful Category 4 hurricane initially predicted to pass very close to St. Thomas. This prediction prompted locals to be particularly thorough in their pre-storm preparations; however, Luis passed further away from the island and caused relatively moderate damage. Virgin Islanders questioned the accuracy of the National Hurricane Center wind advisories, as Hurricane Marilyn caused significant damage for a mere "category 2" storm. Damage on St. Thomas was remiscent of the damage seen on St. Croix in 1989, when Hurricane Hugo, a category 4 storm, caused catastrophic damage. Because St. Thomas is a very hilly island, it is possible that sustained winds on exposed hills (some of which have elevations that are thousands of feet above sea level) were significantly stronger than the sea-level wind speed estimates given by the hurricane center in its main advisory. Residents also reported tornado vortices in certain neighborhoods.

Martinique

Guadeloupe

Hurricane Marilyn moved directly across Îles des Saintes and the southern part of Basse-Terre Island in the night of September 14–15, 1995, bringing the highest known rainfall totals to the island from a tropical cyclone.

Damage was moderate in the south, due to the massive amount of rainfall.
Marilyn was one of the three cyclones that affected the region in 1995 after Tropical Storm Iris and Hurricane Luis as the total estimated damage was near 500 millions francs.

U.S. Virgin Islands

In St. Croix and St. Thomas, rainfall totals reached about 10 in.

Marilyn was directly responsible for seven deaths, most due to drowning on boats or offshore. Ten thousand people were left homeless on St. Thomas, and most buildings sustained some damage.

The island of St. Thomas was the hardest hit by the storm, where about 80% of the homes and businesses were damaged or destroyed, including the hospital and the water desalination plant; five people were killed. Storm surge in the Charlotte Amalie harbor beached the USCGC Point Ledge and damaged many smaller boats. Elsewhere in the territory, there was moderate to severe damage on St. Croix and St. John. The Federal Emergency Management Agency (FEMA) estimated $1 billion in losses, while an economic research group in the U.S. Virgin Islands set the damage toll at $3 billion. Additionally, losses on St. Thomas were about $1.5 billion and for a total of $2 billion in the three U.S. Virgin Islands.

Puerto Rico
Marilyn passed over the islands of Vieques and Culebra, where it caused much damage.

There were reports of extensive flash flooding across northern and eastern Puerto Rico, and 12,000 people were forced to ride out the storm in shelters. One person was killed in Culebra. President Bill Clinton declared Puerto Rico a federal disaster area, making it available to federal aid.

Another two hundred homes on the island were damaged.

Antigua
The Antigua Meteorological Service reported that the island had extensive flooding and damage to banana trees. The other damage reported was from the wind.

Other areas
Antigua reported sustained winds of just , tropical depression-strength. The New York Times reported that the British Virgin Islands had little to no damage from Marilyn.

Aftermath

Puerto Rico
Relief supplies in the wake of Hurricane Marilyn were sent to Puerto Rico and the U.S. Virgin Islands. Officials of FEMA set up camps on the islands to give out food, water and shelter supplies.

U.S. Virgin Islands

President of the United States Bill Clinton declared the U.S. Virgin Islands a federal disaster area, making it available to federal aid. However, the National Guard did not appear on St. Thomas until two days following the hurricane, and FEMA did not appear until three days following. In the meantime, significant looting, particularly of grocery stores, prevented an orderly distribution of food and water.
 Five supply distribution sites were being operated by the Virgin Islands Territorial Emergency Management Agency (VITEMA). More than 2,100 federal agency personnel had been deployed to help out with the cleanup from Hurricane Marilyn. Four contracts were quickly accepted for immediate building repairs. Diving teams were sent to check for harbor damage and United States Navy Seabees started working on repairing public buildings. Military and security forces included about 500 Army, Air Force, and Navy personnel, 500 National Guardsmen, and 500 federal law enforcement personnel. The airport in St. Thomas was open for flight using a mobile control tower. The St. Thomas hospital was open, but was running on generators.

The first FEMA Disaster Recovery Centers opened on September 23 on St. Thomas. A reported indicated that by October 11, 1500 loans were granted for home repair, mostly for under $2500. More than 19,000 disaster housing applications were filed, with over 2800 being accepted. About 5000 of 15,000 assigned inspections were completed. Over 7800 applications for Individual and Family Grants had been received and, of the 4,000 SBA loan applications filed, 43 had been approved for a total of $744,100 – an average loan of $17,300.

Records and retirement

Marilyn was the last of three tropical cyclones to affect the Leeward Islands especially Dominica and Guadeloupe in a short period of time of the 1995 season, the first being Hurricane Iris, late August and the second being Hurricane Luis, ten days before.

Due to intense destruction in the US Virgin Islands, the name Marilyn was retired in the spring of 1996, and will never again be used for an Atlantic hurricane and was replaced with the name Michelle for the 2001 season, which would retire itself after that season.

See also

 Other storms of the same name
 List of Atlantic hurricanes
 Timeline of the 1995 Atlantic hurricane season

References

External links
 NHC Marilyn Report
 NOAA storm data on Hurricane Marilyn
 HPC page on Hurricane Marilyn
 NWS Service Assessment
 Marilyn path by UNISYS

Marilyn
Marilyn (1995)
Marilyn
Marilyn
Marilyn
Marilyn
Marilyn
Marilyn
Marilyn
Marilyn
Marilyn
Marilyn
Marilyn
Marilyn
Marilyn
Marilyn
Marilyn
Marilyn
Marilyn
Marilyn
Marilyn
1995 in the Caribbean
1995 natural disasters
Natural disasters in the United States Virgin Islands
Marilyn
Marilyn)
Marilyn